Dendrolaelaps bisetus is a species of mite in the family Ologamasidae.

This species was formerly a member of the genus Gamasellus.

References

bisetus
Articles created by Qbugbot
Animals described in 1891